Platyptilia naminga is a moth of the family Pterophoridae. It is found in Chita Oblast, Russia.

References

Moths described in 1996
naminga
Endemic fauna of Russia